The Catalan Republic was a short-lived independent state under French protection proclaimed in 1641 by the States-General of Catalonia led by Pau Claris, during the Reapers' War.

The States-General of Catalonia, headed by the President of the Deputation of the General of Catalonia (or Generalitat) Pau Claris, proclaimed the Catalan Republic on 17 January 1641. On 23 January 1641 the Braços Generals led by Pau Claris proclaimed Louis XIII of France as Count of Barcelona, putting the Principality of Catalonia under French sovereignty. Louis XIII was succeeded upon his death in 1643 by Louis XIV (the 'Sun King'), who remained Count of Barcelona until 1652, when Catalonia was reincorporated into the Spanish Monarchy.

History

On 27 October an agreement was finally reached with du Plessis-Besançon to obtain supplies against the army of the King of Spain directed by Pedro Fajardo, Marquis of los Vélez.

With the victory of the army of the Marquis of Los Vélez in Tarragona on 23 December it continued its advance towards Barcelona, while the French army of d'Espenan proceeded to leave Catalonia to France at the beginning of January 1641. Negotiations with the French intensified, on 3 January a delegation of three Catalans met with Cardinal Richelieu who assured them protection if they were a republic like Genoa. In this sense on 14 January du Plessis-Besançon went at the residence of the president of the Deputation of the General of Catalonia or Generalitat, Pau Claris, to still conferring. From this negotiation, on 16 January, Pau Claris presented a proposal before the States-General by which the King of France agreed to put the Principality under his protection if Catalonia changed its government to a republic. On 17 January 1641, the States-General of Catalonia proclaimed the Catalan Republic under French protection for the first time. Pau Claris appealed on 23 January to Louis XIII, recognizing him as Count of Barcelona (as Louis I) and placed the Principality of Catalonia under French sovereignty.

On 26 January 1641, at the end of the Battle of Montjuïc, the army of Philip IV was defeated by a Franco-Catalan army and had to withdraw. Pau Claris died a month later. Louis XIV was titled as Count of Barcelona in succession to his father in 1643. Finally, the dismissal of the Count-Duke of Olivares, the ravages caused by the famine and the plague, the commitment made by Philip IV to respect the Catalan constitutions and institutions, and the retaking of Barcelona by Philip's army put an end to the war in 1652, and the Principality of Catalonia was reincorporated into the Monarchy of Spain.

References

External links 
 First Catalan Republic

States and territories established in 1641
History of Catalonia
Politics of Catalonia
Former republics
Reapers' War
Thirty Years' War
Former countries in Spanish history
Former countries in French history
1652 disestablishments
1641 establishments in Spain